The 1914–15 Hong Kong First Division League season was the 7th since its establishment.

League table

References
1914–15 Hong Kong First Division (RSSSF)
香港倒後鏡blog

1914-15
1914–15 domestic association football leagues
football
football
1914 in Asian football
1915 in Asian football